, also known as , are members of transnational organized crime syndicates originating in Japan.

Syndicates

Four largest syndicates
Although yakuza membership has declined following an anti-gang law aimed specifically at yakuza and passed by the Japanese government in 1992, there are thought to be about 25,900 active yakuza members in Japan today.

Designated bōryokudan 

A  is a "particularly harmful" yakuza group registered by the Prefectural Public Safety Commissions under the  enacted in 1991.

The numbers that follow the names of bōryokudan groups refer to the group's leadership. For example, Yoshinori Watanabe headed the Yamaguchi-gumi fifth; on his retirement, Shinobu Tsukasa became head of the Yamaguchi-gumi sixth, and "Yamaguchi-gumi VI" is the group's formal name.

Designated bōryokudan in the past

Other notable bōryokudan

Other prominent bōryokudan

References

Bibliography

 Bruno, A. (2007). "The Yakuza, the Japanese Mafia" CrimeLibrary: Time Warner
 Kaplan, David, Dubro Alec. (1986). Yakuza Addison-Wesley
 Kaplan, David, Dubro Alec. (2003). Yakuza: Expanded Edition University of California Press
 Hill, Peter B.E. (2003). The Japanese Mafia: Yakuza, Law, and the State Oxford University Press
 Johnson, David T. (2001). The Japanese Way of Justice: Prosecuting Crime in Japan Oxford University Press
 Miyazaki, Manabu. (2005) Toppamono: Outlaw. Radical. Suspect. My Life in Japan's Underworld Kotan Publishing
 Seymour, Christopher. (1996). Yakuza Diary Atlantic Monthly Press
 Saga, Junichi., Bester, John. (1991) Confessions of a Yakuza: A Life in Japan's Underworld Kodansha America
 Schilling, Mark. (2003). The Yakuza Movie Book Stone Bridge Press
 Sterling, Claire. (1994). Thieves' World Simon & Schuster
 Sho Fumimura (Writer), Ryoichi Ikegami (Artist). (Series 1993–1997) "Sanctuary" Viz Communications Inc (Vol 2:;;;;;;;)
 Tendo, Shoko (2007). Yakuza Moon: Memoirs of a Gangster's Daughter Kodansha International 
 Young Yakuza. Dir. Jean-Pierre Limosin. Cinema Epoch, 2007.

External links

 101 East – Battling the Yakuza—Al Jazeera (Video)

 Blood ties: Yakuza daughter lifts lid on hidden hell of gangsters' families
 Yakuza: The Japanese Mafia
 Yakuza Portal site